Herbert Hoscam (died 1180) was of English birth, and served as prelate to Irpinia area, as the Archbishop of Conza.

References

English Roman Catholic saints
Italian Roman Catholic saints
12th-century Christian saints
1180 deaths
12th-century Italian Roman Catholic archbishops
Year of birth unknown